Fotis Ioannidis (Greek: Φώτης Ιωαννίδης; born 10 January 2000) is a Greek professional footballer who plays as a forward for Super League club Panathinaikos.

Club career

Levadiakos
On 10 December 2018, Ioannidis scored his first goal for the 2018–19 season, in a 1–1 away draw against rivals Panionios.
On 24 February 2019, helped, as a substitute, his club to snatch an unlikely victory in the dying moments of stoppage time. Completely unmarked in the six-yard area, connected with a floating cross, planting a firm header into the net in a 1–0 away win against Xanthi in his club's effort to avoid relegation.

Panathinaikos
On 10 August 2020, Panathinaikos officially announced the purchase of the young striker, who signed a four-year contract with the club.

Personal life
Ioannidis’ father, Vasilis, is a former professional international footballer from Komotini. He played at the first division for Apollon Pontus, Olympiacos and Panionios.

Career statistics

Club

Honours
Panathinaikos
Greek Cup: 2021–22

References

External links 

2000 births
Living people
Greek footballers
Greece under-21 international footballers
Greece youth international footballers
Greece international footballers
Super League Greece players
Super League Greece 2 players
Levadiakos F.C. players
Panathinaikos F.C. players
Association football forwards
Footballers from Chalcis